Sistiana (Slovene: Sesljan) is a village in Friuli-Venezia Giulia, in the far northeast of Italy near the Slovene border. It is a frazione of the comune of Duino-Aurisina.

Geography
The village lies north-west of Trieste, the provincial capital. The closest airport is located 7 nm west of Sistiana.  Average altitude: 70 m above sea level. Sistiana is on time zone UTC +1 (+2DT).

History
The name is derived from the Latin Sextilianum, which may represent the first Roman settlement in the region of Trieste. A Roman villa has been discovered nearby, and the local quarries were exploited in the 2nd century AD.

There were border clashes in the 16th century between the lords of Duino and the city of Trieste.

Notes and references

Frazioni of the Province of Trieste
Cities and towns in Friuli-Venezia Giulia